Alexander Zakharevich Myshlayevsky (1856–1920) was a Russian general during World War I. He was the deputy commander of the Caucasian Army and its field commander during the Battle of Sarikamish.  He was originally a military historian graduated from Imperial General Staff Academy.  Myshlayevsky was dismissed from service in March 1915.

References

Imperial Russian Army generals
Russian military personnel of World War I
Russian military writers
Russian military historians
1856 births
1920 deaths
People from Novomyrhorod
People from Kherson Governorate
20th-century Russian historians